Ullrich Haupt (8 August 1887 – 5 August 1931) was a German actor who rose to prominence in Hollywood films. He was the father of Ullrich Haupt Jr., who was also an actor. Haupt died in a hunting accident, three days before his 44th birthday.

Filmography

References

External links

 

1887 births
1931 deaths
American male film actors
German male film actors
German male silent film actors
American male silent film actors
German emigrants to the United States
20th-century American male actors
People from the Province of Pomerania
20th-century German male actors
People from Złocieniec